Bassapur is a small village in the Belgaum taluka of Belgaum district in the southern Indian state of Karnataka. As of the 2011 Indian census, it had a population of 3,059.

References

Villages in Belagavi district